Hammeren Hydroelectric Power Station is a hydroelectric power station located in Oslo, Norway. It is the only power station in Oslo, and among the oldest power stations still running in Norway. It has a total installed capacity of 5 MWp, and an annual production of 16 GWh. The power station utilises the waterfalls from Skjærsjøen to Maridalsvannet, with a total height of 105 m. It was established in 1900 by the company Christiania Elektricitetsværk, originally with four generator units, and increased to six units in 1901. In 1927, the six generators were replaced by a single 5.6 MW unit.

See also

References

Hydroelectric power stations in Norway
Maridalen
Buildings and structures in Oslo
1900 establishments in Norway